The International Ice Charting Working Group (IICWG) was formed in October 1999 to promote cooperation between the world's ice centers on all matters concerning sea ice and icebergs.

Member Organizations
 Canadian Ice Service
 Danish Meteorological Institute
 Finnish Ice Service
 Federal Maritime and Hydrographic Agency of Germany
 Icelandic Meteorological Office
 Hydrographical Department, Maritime Safety Agency, Japan
 Norwegian Meteorological Institute
 Russian Federation Arctic and Antarctic Research Institute
 Swedish Meteorological and Hydrological Institute
 United States National Ice Center
 U.S. Coast Guard International Ice Patrol – North Atlantic Iceberg Detection and Forecasting

References

Multidisciplinary research institutes
International research institutes
Organizations established in 1999